The Crystal Mountain Sandstone is an Ordovician geologic formation in the Ouachita Mountains of Arkansas and Oklahoma. This interval was first described in 1892, but remained unnamed until 1909 as part of a study on the Ouachita Mountains of Arkansas by Albert Homer Purdue.

See also

 List of fossiliferous stratigraphic units in Arkansas
 Paleontology in Arkansas

References

Ordovician geology of Oklahoma
Ordovician Arkansas
Ordovician southern paleotropical deposits